France competed at the 2014 Winter Olympics in Sochi, Russia, from 7 to 23 February 2014.

French President François Hollande did not attend the opening ceremony. He has not said publicly that the decision was a political gesture.

The French delegation won a total of 15 medals (including 4 gold), its most ever at a Winter Olympic Games and ranked eighth in overall medals.

Medalists 

|align="left" valign="top"|

| width="22%" align="left" valign="top" |

Alpine skiing 

On 22 January 2014, 14 provisional slots have been filled by the French alpine skiing team. The remainder of the team, including pending selections, was officially announced on 27 January 2014. Cyprien Richard and Brice Roger (tore his anterior cruciate ligament during training) were selected to the team, however did not compete in any race.

Men

Women

Biathlon 

Based on their performance at the 2012 and 2013 Biathlon World Championships France qualified 6 men and 6 women.

Men

Women

Mixed

Bobsleigh 

* – Denotes the driver of each sled

Cross-country skiing 

France has qualified for the following events according to the quota allocation by the International Ski Federation (FIS). Aurélie Dabudyk was selected to the team but did not compete in any race.

Distance
Men

Women

Sprint
Men

Women

Figure skating 

France has achieved the following quota places:

Singles

Team trophy

Freestyle skiing 

France has achieved a total of 20 quota places for the following events. On 22 January 2014, 14 provisional slots have been filled by the French freestyle skiing team. The remainder of the team, including pending selections, will be officially announced on 27 January 2014.

Halfpipe

Moguls

Ski cross

Qualification legend: FA – Qualify to medal round; FB – Qualify to consolation round

Slopestyle

Luge 

France qualified a single female athlete in the luge.

Nordic combined 

France has qualified a maximum of five athletes and a spot in the team relay. The team selection has been announced on 22 January 2014.

Short track speed skating 

France qualified 1 woman and 3 men for the Olympics during World Cup 3 and 4 in November 2013.

Men

Women

Qualification legend: ADV – Advanced due to being impeded by another skater; FA – Qualify to medal round; FB – Qualify to consolation round

Ski jumping 

France has received the following start quotas. On 27 January 2014, only four ski jumpers from the French team had qualified for the Games.

Snowboarding 

France has achieved a total of 14 quota places in snowboarding. On 22 January 2014, eight provisional slots have been filled by the French freestyle skiing team. The remainder of the team, including pending selections, was officially announced on 27 January 2014.

Alpine

Freestyle

Qualification Legend: QF – Qualify directly to final; QS – Qualify to semifinal

Snowboard cross

Qualification legend: FA – Qualify to medal round; FB – Qualify to consolation round

Speed skating 

Based on the results from the fall World Cups during the 2013–14 ISU Speed Skating World Cup season, France has earned the following start quotas:

Men

Team pursuit

References

External links 

 
 

Nations at the 2014 Winter Olympics
2014
Winter Olympics